On the Sunday of Life... is the debut album of English progressive rock band Porcupine Tree, first released on May 12, 1992. It compiles tracks that Steven Wilson produced and recorded for two cassette-only releases, Tarquin's Seaweed Farm (1989) and The Nostalgia Factory (1991). The rest of the music from these tapes was released three years later in the compilation album Yellow Hedgerow Dreamscape.

Most of the lyrics were written by Alan Duffy, a school friend with whom Steven Wilson had lost touch a few years before the album was released. The album title was chosen from a long list of nonsense titles compiled by Richard Allen of Delerium.

A small run of 1000 copies in a deluxe gatefold sleeve were released in early 1992. The album, over time, eventually sold in excess of 20,000 copies.

The version of "Radioactive Toy" that featured on the album is re-recorded. The original version was later released on Yellow Hedgerow Dreamscape. In addition, the original versions of "The Nostalgia Factory", "Queen Quotes Crowley", and "This Long Silence" are about a minute shorter on this album.

Track listing
Credits adapted from the liner notes of On the Sunday of Life....

Personnel

Porcupine Tree
 Steven Wilson – vocals, all other instruments

Additional personnel
 John Marshall – drums on "Third Eye Surfer"
 Solomon St. Jemain – additional guitar & voice on "Queen Quotes Crowley"
 Master Timothy Masters – oboe

External links
Porcupine Tree Official Website

References

Porcupine Tree albums
1992 debut albums